Larduet is a surname. Notable people with the surname include:

José Larduet (born 1990), Cuban boxer
Manrique Larduet (born 1996), Cuban artistic gymnast